Joey is a 1997 Australian children's film. The film was released as the theatrical film by Roadshow Entertainment on December 26, 1997, in Australia. The film was also released as the direct-to-video film by Metro-Goldwyn-Mayer on June 16, 1998, in the United States and by Warner Home Video under the MGM Home Entertainment label on August 6, 1999, in Japan.

Plot 
Billy is a boy who is trying to save a baby kangaroo called Joey after its family is captured and taken to Sydney. Billy travels to Sydney to reunite Joey with his family only to discover that Joey is not the only one who needs to be saved. Linda, the young daughter of the U.S. Ambassador joins Billy as they fight to save Joey.

Summary 
The movie starts off with a boy, Billy McGregor, narrating how he enjoys living in the country side. He introduces his best friends which are Kangaroos, Kim (mother), Wal (father) and their joey, Joey. He uses a remote control camera with an attached camera and stuffed kangaroo. Soon after, the Dixon family drive their car to hunt the kangaroos. Billy notices them and whistles to the kangaroos. They run off before the Dixon's spot them. Using the scopes on their guns they search the area and spot Billy running to get his remote control car then home. Mr Dixon spots him, angry he and his sons give chase, driving towards the boy. Billy gets into a Ute owned by his aboriginal friend, Mick, and escapes. Mr Dixon yells out to him, warning him to stay off his property.

He drives home just when his morning alarm goes off, which also feeds his fish through a contraption he made, and successfully sneaks into his room through the window. He meets his mother, Penny, out front of the house who is holding his bag. She tells him that she'll be very angry is she finds out that he was on the Dixon's land again. She does not know he was just there. Billy makes a snide remark that it's better that she doesn't. Mick remarks how crazy Billy is as he grabs his push-bike and rides to school. He arrives late, yet again sneaking in through the window. The teacher is asleep and the class quietly watches as Billy walks to his desk. He starts to carefully pull out his chair, so not to as wake the teacher, when the youngest Dixon slams his hand on his desk, waking the teacher. This leads to the teacher spotting Billy's late arrival and tells him to stay after school. During recess Dixon and another boy start a fight by using ants, surrounded by classmates cheering them on. Billy runs through the crowd, grabs the ants and returns them to the ground just outside of school. Angry, Dixon tackles Billy to the ground and the two begin fighting. A police officer sees the fight and breaks the two apart. Dixon tells the officer about Billy being on their property again this morning. This time they want to press charges. Frustrated, the officer takes him home and chats with his mother about this morning.

During their discussion, the officer also reminds Billy's mother that their house will foreclose and they need to come up with $50,000 by October. Penny promises to get the money. The officer suggests that he and Penny become a couple, saying that Billy needs a father then leaves.

Later that night a mysterious man arrives at the Dixon house with a livestock truck. The Dixon's have hired him to get rid of the kangaroos. The man grabs a bunch of tranquilize guns and tells them he's taking them to his "Kangaroo Kingdom". They then shoot every kangaroo except for Joey, who narrowly escaped. Mick and Billy arrive near the scene shortly after it happens because they spotted lightning and went to check it out. Mick notices that there were recently two trucks that drove by, leading to and from the kangaroo area. Mick tells Billy that they were ambushed and taken, showing a dart that was left on the ground. The two hear the whining of Joey. Billy approaches Joey and grabs him before he can hop away. He tells Mick that he's got to take him home with him. Mick warns Billy that Penny won't like it. However Billy wins by saying that Joey needs help.

Billy goes to the train station and boards a midnight express to Sydney.

Cast 
 Jamie Croft as Billy McGregor 
 Alex McKenna as Linda Ross
 Rebecca Gibney as Penny McGregor
 Ed Begley Jr. as Ambassador Ted Ross

References

External links 
 
 
 

1997 films
1990s children's comedy films
Australian children's comedy films
Films scored by Roger Mason (musician)
Films with screenplays by Stuart Beattie
Village Roadshow Pictures films
1990s English-language films